is a former Japanese football player.

Playing career
Nakagawa was born in Osaka Prefecture on August 26, 1969. After graduating from Kokushikan University, he joined Yokohama Flügels in 1992. However he could hardly play in the match behind Atsuhiko Mori. In June 1995, he moved to rival club in Yokohama, Yokohama Marinos. In 1996, he played many matches when regular goalkeeper Yoshikatsu Kawaguchi let the club for 1996 Summer Olympics and injury. In 1998, he moved to Kyoto Purple Sanga. However he could hardly play in the match behind Shigetatsu Matsunaga. In March 2000, he moved to Nagoya Grampus Eight on loan. In 2001, he returned to Purple Sanga was relegated to J2 League. From June, he became a regular goalkeeper and the club returned to J1 League in a season. However he could hardly play in the match in 2002 season and retired end of 2002 season.

Club statistics

References

External links

sports.geocities.jp

1969 births
Living people
Kokushikan University alumni
Association football people from Osaka Prefecture
Japanese footballers
J1 League players
J2 League players
Yokohama Flügels players
Yokohama F. Marinos players
Kyoto Sanga FC players
Nagoya Grampus players
Association football goalkeepers